Ephyrodes cacata is a species of moth in the family Erebidae. It is found in North America.

The MONA or Hodges number for Ephyrodes cacata is 8582.

References

Further reading

 
 
 

Eulepidotinae
Articles created by Qbugbot
Moths described in 1852